The Jazz Passengers are an American jazz group founded in 1987 by saxophonist Roy Nathanson and trombonist Curtis Fowlkes.

The band grew out of a partnership between Nathanson and Fowlkes in 1987, after the two had played with John Lurie's band The Lounge Lizards. Other regular members include vibraphonist Bill Ware, bassist Brad Jones and drummer E. J. Rodriguez; the group has often featured a violinist (Rob Thomas, Jim Nolet or, more recently, Sam Bardfeld). Guitarists Marc Ribot and David Fiuczynski played in earlier formations of the group. The album that is perhaps their masterpiece, the Hal Willner-produced In Love (High Street, 1994), features vocal contributions from Deborah Harry, Jeff Buckley, Jimmy Scott, Bob Dorough and Mavis Staples. Harry later became a regular member of the band, appearing on a number of follow-up albums, including Individually Twisted (which includes a duet with Elvis Costello), Costello also sings on another track without Harry. Recently the Passengers have recorded infrequently as a full ensemble, though the individual bandmembers' recent side projects tend to feature many fellow Passengers, as well as a similarly skewed musical sensibility.

In 2005, Nathanson composed a work commemorating the world's oldest object, a 4.404 billion year old zircon found in Australia. The work was performed by The Jazz Passengers at a "Rock Concert" held in Madison, Wisconsin in April of that year.

Discography 
 1987 – Broken Night Red Light (Les Disques du Crépuscule)
 1988 – Deranged and Decomposed (Les Disques du Crépuscule)
 1990 – Implement Yourself (New World)
 1991 – Live at the Knitting Factory (Knitting Factory)
 1993 – Plain Old Joe (Allegro/Knitting Factory)
 1994 – In Love (High Street, Windham Hill)
 1996 – Individually Twisted (32 Jazz) with Deborah Harry
 1998 – "Live" in Spain (32 Jazz) with Deborah Harry
 2005 - The Rock Concert (A Stony Muse Production/Roy Nathanson)
 2010 – Reunited (Justin Time)
 2017 - Still Life with Trouble (Enja)

External links 
 The Jazz Passengers (Official Website)
 "Jazz Passengers, A Modernist Septet", by Jon Pareles
 "Jazz and Theater Add Up To a New Form of Vaudeville", by Peter Watrous
 "The Jazz Passengers Discography at Allmusic"
 The Jazz Passengers Discography at Discogs

American jazz ensembles
Septets
Musical groups established in 1987
Knitting Factory Records artists
Windham Hill Records artists
Justin Time Records artists
Enja Records artists